Ebony Antonio (born 18 December 1991) is an Australian rules footballer playing for the Fremantle Football Club in the AFL Women's (AFLW). Antonio represented The Allies in the inaugural AFL Women's State of Origin match in 2017, and won AFL Women's All-Australian selection and the Fremantle fairest and best award in 2018. She also won the Goal of the Year and shared the Western Derby Medal with Kiara Bowers in 2022.

Early life
Antonio played football and basketball as a junior. Between 2009 and 2011, she played in the State Basketball League (SBL) for the Willetton Tigers. During this time, she spent two seasons with the West Coast Waves in the Women's National Basketball League (WNBL). In 2012, she moved to Bendigo in Victoria to play for the Bendigo Braves and Bendigo Spirit. She played two seasons for both teams, and she was a member of the Spirit's 2012/13 and 2013/14 WNBL championship squads. In 2014, she returned to Perth to play for the Willetton Tigers before re-joining the Waves for 2014/15 season. She continued on with the Tigers in 2015 and 2016. She won championships with Willetton in 2009, 2010, 2011 and 2016. She turned her attention to football in 2016, playing with the Swan Districts in the West Australian Women's Football League (WAWFL).

AFL Women's career

Antonio made her debut in round 1, 2017 in the club's inaugural match against  at VU Whitten Oval. She was the first player to be suspended in the AFLW, receiving a one-week suspension for a high bump on Bulldogs defender Jess Gardner. Antonio returned to play for the Dockers' final five matches of the season. Antonio later played for The Allies in the inaugural AFL Women's State of Origin match against Victoria on 2 September, where she was named among the Allies' best players. Fremantle signed Antonio for the 2018 season during the trade and signing period in May 2017.

Antonio had a much improved season in 2018, when she was selected in the 2018 AFL Women's All-Australian team and won the Fremantle fairest and best award. She had minor surgery on her Achilles following the AFLW season, forcing her to miss most of the WAWFL season with Swan Districts. Fremantle signed Antonio for the 2019 season during the trade and signing period in May 2018.

Fremantle signed Antonio for the 2020 season during the trade and sign period in April 2019.

Leading into the 2020 season, womens.afl journalist Sarah Black named Antonio at no. 20 on her list of the top 30 players in the AFLW. She was selected in womens.afls Team of the Week in round 6, and was selected in the initial 40-woman squad for the 2020 AFL Women's All-Australian team.

Leading into the 2021 season, Sarah Black named Antonio at no. 15 on her annual list of the top 30 players in the AFLW. In June 2021, Antonio re-signed with the club for two years.

In round 1 of the 2022 season, Antonio kicked three goals from twelve disposals, including a Goal of the Year contender in the first quarter, in Fremantle's Western Derby win to share the Western Derby Medal with teammate Kiara Bowers; she also won the maximum ten coaches' votes and was named in womens.afls Team of the Week. Antonio was one of three late outs for Fremantle heading into its record-breaking loss to Melbourne in round 9 due to the AFL's health and safety protocols, before returning in round 10 against .

Statistics
Updated to the end of the 2022 season.

|- style=background:#EAEAEA
| 2017 ||  || 12
| 6 || 2 || 1 || 45 || 25 || 70 || 19 || 27 || 0.3 || 0.2 || 7.5 || 4.2 || 11.7 || 3.2 || 4.5 || 0
|-
| 2018 ||  || 12
| 7 || 3 || 0 || 54 || 40 || 94 || 15 || 31 || 0.4 || 0.0 || 7.7 || 5.7 || 13.4 || 2.1 || 4.4 || 0
|- style=background:#EAEAEA
| 2019 ||  || 12
| 8 || 5 || 5 || 62 || 20 || 82 || 14 || 24 || 0.6 || 0.6 || 7.8 || 2.5 || 10.3 || 1.8 || 3.0 || 0
|-
| 2020 ||  || 12
| 7 || 4 || 2 || 53 || 32 || 85 || 23 || 30 || 0.6 || 0.3 || 7.6 || 4.6 || 12.1 || 3.3 || 4.3 || 0
|- style=background:#EAEAEA
| 2021 ||  || 12
| 10 || 1 || 4 || 88 || 36 || 124 || 37 || 38 || 0.1 || 0.4 || 8.8 || 3.6 || 12.4 || 3.7 || 3.8 || 0
|-
| 2022 ||  || 12
| 11 || 8 || 4 || 102 || 47 || 149 || 33 || 44 || 0.7 || 0.4 || 9.3 || 4.3 || 13.5 || 3.0 || 4.0 || 6
|- class=sortbottom
! colspan=3 | Career
! 49 !! 24 !! 16 !! 404 !! 200 !! 604 !! 141 !! 194 !! 0.5 !! 0.3 !! 8.2 !! 4.1 !! 12.3 !! 2.9 !! 4.0 !! 6
|}

Personal life
Antonio became engaged to Fremantle teammate and captain Kara Donnellan in April 2018, and they married in October 2019.

Honours and achievements
 AFL Women's All-Australian team: 2018
 Fremantle fairest and best: 2018
 Allies representative honours in AFL Women's State of Origin: 2017
 Goal of the Year: 2022
 Western Derby Medal: 2022

References

External links

 
 
 

Living people
1991 births
Australian rules footballers from Western Australia
Fremantle Football Club (AFLW) players
All-Australians (AFL Women's)
Australian LGBT sportspeople
LGBT players of Australian rules football